Mower (formerly Eric Mower + Associates) is a full-service integrated marketing communications agency that offers consumer and business-to-business marketing and public relations/public affairs.

According the company, about 55% of its work involves B2B marketing, while the rest involves marketing to consumers (B2C). The agency's major clients include National Grid, FirstEnergy, 84.51°, FedEx, ABB, Prysmian Group, Northwest Bank and Ford Dealers.

History
Eric Mower joined the three person Silverman Advertising agency in 1968 and in 1975 the company was renamed Silverman & Mower. In 1980, the firm became Eric Mower and Associates when Eric Mower purchased the firm.

Mower combined with Levy King & White of Buffalo, N.Y., in 1990 and Blair BBDO of Rochester, N.Y., in 1991.  EMA opened its offices in Albany, N.Y.,  in 1996 and in Atlanta, Ga., in 1998. EMA combined with Sage Marcom of Syracuse, N.Y. in 2001; and Price McNabb of Charlotte, N.C. in 2004.  In 2008, EMA combined with Mark Russell & Associates of Syracuse, N.Y. and Atlanta  and with Sawchuck Brown Associates of Albany, N.Y. In addition, EMA combined with Strata-G Communications of Cincinnati, Ohio in 2012 and Middleton & Gendron of New York City in 2014.  And most recently in October 2015, EMA combined with HB Agency, a Boston-based integrated marketing and public relations agency.

In 2018, during Eric Mower's 50th year with the company, the firm rebranded itself as Mower.

In 2019, Doug Kamp was named chief creative officer.

In 2021, Stephanie Crockett was named president and COO of the agency. She became the CEO in January 2023.

In August 2022, Eric Mower sold 100% ownership of the company to the staff via an employee stock ownership plan.

Operations

Locations and staff
The agency employs 155 people in offices in New York City, Buffalo, Albany, Rochester, Syracuse, Chicago, Atlanta, Boston, Denver, Miami, Charlotte and Cincinnati.

In 2022, PRWeek named Mower to its Best Places to Work list. In 2021, 2014 and 2012, Mower was named by Ad Age as one of the 50 "Best Places to Work" in advertising. Mower was also named a "Top Place to Work in PR" five times by PR News, most recently in 2020, and was twice named Agency of the Year by Bulldog Reporter.  The agency's work has been recognized in the Cannes Lion, Clio, One Show, Addy, PRSA Silver Anvil, ACE and B2B Awards.

Finances
A business report by PRWeek notes that Mower was the world's 105th largest agency with revenue of $12.9 million in 2017. This was a drop of 12% compared to 2016 when revenue was $14.6 million. According the agency, it had estimated 2017 capitalized billings in excess of $192 million.

Notable campaigns

 New York State Tourism Industry Association "Roam the Empire"
 ABB "Adaptive Execution"
 Domtar Paper "Paper Because" 
 Nucor "It's our nature" 
 Freightliner Trucks "Hardest Working Cities" 
 BlueCross BlueShield of WNY "Painkillers Kill" 
Iroquois Healthcare Association "The Caring Gene"

Recent achievements
In 2022, Association of National Advertisers (ANA) named Mower the Midsize Agency of the Year at its B2 Awards competition, where the agency won 14 awards for clients including the New York State Tourism Industry Association's “Roam the Empire,” National Grid's “More Opportunities in More Places,” Iroquois Healthcare Association's “Caring Gene,” ABB's “eMine” and “Adaptive Execution,” and Mower's internal agency rebrand “Making Fierce Friends.”  PRNews named Mower to its 2023 Agency Elite Top 100 ranking. Mower won the Grand Prix, as well as the ‘Best Response to Change’ category at The Drum Awards for B2B in 2021 with its work for the Iroquois Health Association. The New York State Tourism Industry Association awarded Mower with its first New Yorker Award in 2022 in recognition of the agency's development of the Roam the Empire campaign to aid tourism businesses in their recovery from the pandemic. The Diversity Action Alliance selected Mower's work for One Hundred Black Men of New York as the 2022 Best DEI Advocacy Campaign. In 2023, the agency was listed in the Chief Marketer 200 for the sixth consecutive year. Mower also earned both a Gold and Silver Adrian Award for its work in travel and tourism marketing during the 2020 Hospitality Sales & Marketing Association International (HSMAI) Adrian Awards.

Mower was ranked 14th in City & State's 2023 New York Political PR Power 50. The ranking lists the top strategic communications professionals in New York politics and policy. Eric Mower was also inducted into the Association of National Advertisers Business-to-Business Marketing Hall of Fame during the 2019 Masters of B2B Marketing Conference in Chicago. The Business Council of New York State presented Eric Mower with the 2022 Corning Award for Excellence.

References

External links
 

1959 establishments in New York (state)
Consulting firms established in 1959
Companies based in Syracuse, New York
Marketing companies of the United States
Public relations companies of the United States